Chadegan County is in Isfahan province, Iran. The capital of the county is the city of Chadegan. At the 2006 census, the county's population was 33,684 in 8,169 households. The following census in 2011 counted 33,942 people in 9,465 households. At the 2016 census, the county's population was 32,479 in 9,833 households.

Administrative divisions

The population history of Chadegan County's administrative divisions over three consecutive censuses is shown in the following table. The latest census shows two districts, four rural districts, and two cities.

References

 

Counties of Isfahan Province